is a song by Japanese rock band Asian Kung-Fu Generation. It was released on March 29, 2017 and was used as the theme song for the 2017 anime film, Night Is Short, Walk On Girl. Yūsuke Nakamura, the illustrator for all of the band's artwork, is also the person in charge of the original character design for the movie.

Music video 
The music video for "Kōya o Aruke" was directed by Nakamura Hiroki. The video features a girl walk around the city at midnight until morning, with the band appear on her back as projection screen.

Track listing

Personnel
Masafumi Gotoh – lead vocals, rhythm guitar
Kensuke Kita – lead guitar
Takahiro Yamada –  bass
Kiyoshi Ijichi – drums
Asian Kung-Fu Generation – producer

Charts

Release history

References 

Asian Kung-Fu Generation songs
2017 singles
Songs written by Masafumi Gotoh
2017 songs
Ki/oon Music singles
Songs written for animated films
Anime songs